Malabang, officially the Municipality of Malabang (Maranao: Inged a Malabang), is a 3rd class municipality in the province of Lanao del Sur, Philippines. According to the 2020 census, it has a population of 49,088 people. The town is one of the two former capitals of the Sultanate of Maguindanao from 1515 until the Spanish conquered the land in 1888, and later became the capital of one of the states of the Confederation of Sultanates in Lanao in 1640.

Etymology
Malabang comes from the Maranao word "mala", which means big, and "bang" or "adhan" in Arabic, which is a call to prayer. An Arab missionary named Sharif Kabunsuan arrived at the Sultanate of Tubok around the 14th century CE to Islamize the people in mainland Mindanao. Upon docking in the shore of Tubok, which is known today as barangay Tambara, the Arab missionary cried out the call to prayer with his loud voice: the first adhan, or "bang", in Lanao. The villagers heard this and called it a "big adhan", or in the local language, "mala a bang", referring to the coming of Islam to the island. Islam spread through mainland Mindanao soon thereafter. Being marked as the historical foundation of the religion of Islam by inhabitants of central and northern Mindanao, the town was given the name Malabang.

History
Malabang, in Lanao del Sur, is considered the oldest settlement in mainland Mindanao.

The Sultanate of T'bok was an established kingdom in present-day Malabang long before the Philippines became a country. The people of Malabang are mostly Maranaos, a tribe indigenous to southern Mindanao; Philippine history books often identify these people as the Iranun tribe. (Iranun is another indigenous tribe of southern Mindanao.) The misconception arose because Iranuns live in some of the barangays in the southern part of Malabang, comprising what is now Balabagan. In March 1969, Executive Order 386, signed by President Carlos P. Garcia, reconstituted the southern part of Malabang as the Municipality of Balabagan. Thus, Iranuns are now residents of Balabagan rather than Malabang.

Malabang played a significant part in the early battles against invaders of the Philippines. During the Spanish conquest, Malabang became the headquarters of Muhammad Kudarat, a great warrior and Sultan of Maguindanao. He used to spend time recuperating in Malabang throughout the period when he was fighting to defend Maguindanao against invasion. He later retired to Malabang when he fell ill. He eventually died and was buried there. In May 1977, Presidential Decree 1135 of President Ferdinand Marcos created the Municipality of Picong (formerly Sultan Gumander) out of the north-western portion of Malabang, where Sultan Kudarat's grave was located.

During the Second World War, when the Japanese invaded the Philippines, the Japanese military built a large camp in Malabang, including a network of tunnels around it. It was considered a major camp of the Japanese forces. In 1942, the Philippine Supreme Court Chief Justice José Abad Santos was brought to this camp, after he was captured in Cebu while fleeing from Japanese forces. Chief Justice Abad Santos was executed in the camp for refusing to cooperate with the Japanese, and was buried in barangay Curahab. The place where the camp is situated and where Mr. Santos was executed was later on named Camp Jose Abad Santos (Camp JAS).

In 1945, United States and Philippine Commonwealth forces, working with Maranao guerillas, occupied Malabang after a siege. During the Siege of Malabang, the guerillas used weapons like the Maranao kris, barong and kampilan to fight the Japanese forces. The victorious American and Philippine Commonwealth troops, together with their Maranao guerrilla allies, eventually defeated the Japanese Imperial forces. When the built of the general headquarters and military camp base of the Philippine Commonwealth Army and Philippine Constabulary was station's active in Malabang from 1945 to 1946 during and ended of World War II.

Malabang as a municipality was founded on March 1, 1893. The locals of the town celebrate the founding day, the Araw ng Malabang every March 1 annually.

Geography
Malabang is one of thirty-nine municipalities comprising the province of Lanao del Sur in northern Mindanao. It lies on the south-west part of the province and belongs to the second district. It has 37 barangays with a total land area of 37,789.28 km2. The distance from Marawi City to Malabang is 71 kilometers. Malabang is bounded on the north by the municipality of Calanogas; on the north-west by the municipality of Picong (Sultan Gumander); on the east by the municipality of Marogong; and on the south by the municipality of Balabagan. To the west of Malabang is Illana Bay.

It is under the administrative supervision of the Autonomous Region in Muslim Mindanao (ARMM) since November 1989, pursuant to R.A. No. 6734 dated June 8, 1989, known as the "Organic Act of ARM
M".

The municipality is a level plain in its central to southern portion. A slope in the north is bounded by the Municipality of Calanogas. There is also a slope in eastern Malabang.

Barangays
Malabang is politically subdivided into 37 barangays.

Climate

Demographics

Languages

The languages spoken in Malabang vary by location and by barangay. Maranao is however the prominent language in Malabang, as the native speakers are the original inhabitants of Malabang.

Cebuano is spoken in some barangays with significant Cebuano Visayan immigrant populations who are mostly Catholic Christians. Along with English, Cebuano is used in Catholic masses and religious services as Malabang is part of the Prelature of Marawi, subject to the Archdiocese of Ozamiz.

Some descendants of Chinese settlers in China Town (Poblacion) speak Mandarin and to some degree, Hokkien.

English is also a commonly spoken language due to American settlers in Matalin and European missionaries, and is also the medium of instruction and working language of the municipal government. Arabic is used in madrassas and spoken by qualified local and visiting ustadz (Islamic scholar) and imams. Settlers from the Maguindanao, Samal and Tausūg ethnic groups in barangay Bunkhouse still use their tribal tongues.

Although there are no settlers from the Tagalog region in Lanao del Sur, Tagalog is still used in schools, being the national language of the Philippines through its national register Filipino. It is also the alternative language of the Maranao townsfolk when conversing with Visayans, since not all of them know how to speak Cebuano.

Economy

Agriculture and fishery are the major resources of Malabang. They are also widely known for coconut production. Warehouses of coconut can be found along the major highways of Malabang. Mills in barangay Matalin produce cassava flour. Other agricultural products produced in Malabang include corn, vegetables and rice. Malabang also plays a major role in fishery production. They are known for puzan (a preserved fish product) and bakas (smoked dried fish). Malabang is central to commerce and trade activity in the coastal area of Lanao del Sur.

Government
The municipality has a mayor, the head of the municipality of Malabang, a municipal vice mayor, and eight municipal councilors. The municipality also has one Sangguniang Kabataan (youth council) representative and one ABC representative from the Punong Barangay (barangay captains).

Infrastructure

Transportation

Land Transport Malabang is quite sufficient when it comes to land transportation to the nearby municipalities. Tricycles are the most-commonly-used transportation around the town. Usually, in the elevated part of Malabang, public transportation such as town ace and multi-cab are used. There are also public utility vans and jeepneys available to nearby cities and municipalities.

Air Transport Malabang Airport is the small airport of Malabang in the province of Lanao del Sur. This airport is classified as a secondary airport, or a minor commercial airport, by the Philippine Air Transportation Office. Malabang Airport is the only airport in the province. As of 2015, no airlines serve this airport.

Sea Transport Malabang has only a small seaport. Daily coastal launches connect Malabang with Cotabato City, Maguindanao. Privately owned boats and rental boats are available for sea travel.

Medical Services
Dr. Serapio B. Montañer Memorial District Hospital or known to many as Mabul Hospital is the public hospital in Malabang, and is listed as a secondary hospital in the province. There are also several municipal private clinics in Malabang.

Telecommunications
The Philippine Long Distance Telephone Company provides fixed line services. Wireless mobile communications services are provided by Smart Communications and Globe Telecommunications.

Education
Although listed as 4th class municipality, all levels of education are attainable in Malabang, a center of learning in the coastal area of Lanao del Sur. Multiple colleges are present, including the community branch of Mindanao State University. Arabic studies are also offered at all levels. Other notable secondary school in Malabang is Our Lady of Peace High School, a Catholic school and Malabang National High School

References

External links
 Malabang Profile at the DTI Cities and Municipalities Competitive Index
 Local Governance Performance Management System
 Philippine Census Information
 [ Philippine Standard Geographic Code]

1907 establishments in the Philippines
Municipalities of Lanao del Sur
Populated places established in 1907